In 4-dimensional geometry, the cubic cupola is a 4-polytope bounded by a rhombicuboctahedron, a parallel cube, connected by 6 square prisms, 12 triangular prisms, 8 triangular pyramids.

Related polytopes
The cubic cupola can be sliced off from a runcinated tesseract, on a hyperplane parallel to cubic cell. The cupola can be seen in an edge-centered (B3) orthogonal projection of the runcinated tesseract:

See also 
 Cubic pyramid
 Octahedral cupola
 Runcinated tesseract

References

External links
 Segmentochora: cube || sirco, K-4.71 

4-polytopes